Sibahle Ndiphiwe 'Rabz' Maxwane (born 14 August 1995) is a South African rugby union player for the  in the Pro14 and the  in the Currie Cup. He usually plays on the wing.

Rugby career

2013 : Youth rugby

Maxwane was born in Queenstown and attended Dale College Boys' High School in nearby King William's Town, playing first team rugby for Dale College in 2013 and 2014.

He earned some provincial colours too, when he was named in the Border squad for the 2013 Under-18 Academy Week held in Durban.

2014–2016 : Western Province

Maxwane joined the Western Province Rugby Institute for the 2014 season. He was named in the  squad for the 2014 Under-19 Provincial Championship, but failed to make any appearances in the competition. However, he did feature for a Western Province Rugby Academy XV in a match against a France Under-18 team in August 2014.

He was in action for Western Province in 2015, making nine appearances in the Under-21 Provincial Championship.

He also joined the South Africa Sevens academy, where he was named in the Blitzboks wider training squad that prepared for the 2016 Summer Olympics.

He returned to the Under-21 team, starting all eight of their matches in the 2016 Under-21 Provincial Championship. He scored one try against the s and two against the  during the regular season to help Western Province finish top of the log. He finished as his team's top try scorer, and just one behind the top try scorers in the competition, the s' Elden Schoeman and the s' Tristan Blewett, and was also named the team's best back of the season at the annual awards ceremony.

2017–present : Bulls

At the end of the 2016 season, the Pretoria-based  announced that Maxwane would join them for the 2017 season; he was subsequently also included in the  Super Rugby squad for the 2017 season.

References

South African rugby union players
Living people
1995 births
People from Queenstown, South Africa
Rugby union wings
Western Province (rugby union) players
Blue Bulls players
Bulls (rugby union) players
Cheetahs (rugby union) players
Free State Cheetahs players
Lions (United Rugby Championship) players
Golden Lions players
Rugby union players from the Eastern Cape